"So Pure" is a song by Alanis Morissette from her album Supposed Former Infatuation Junkie. The term may also refer to:
"So Pure" (Baby D song)
"So Pure", a song by the 3rd and the Mortal from the album In This Room